Tabula may refer to:

Tabula (company), a semiconductor company
Tabula (game), a game thought to be the predecessor to backgammon
Tabula (magazine), a magazine published in Tbilisi, Georgia
Tabula ansata, a tablet with handles

See also
 Tabula Rasa (disambiguation)